Navy Divers is a four-episode  Australian observational documentary series that debuted on the ABC1 on 28 October 2008. The program follows 27 men training to enter the clearance diver branch of the Royal Australian Navy, into which only 14 will be accepted.

References

External links
Navy Divers at abc.net.au

Australian Broadcasting Corporation original programming
2008 Australian television series debuts